A water tower is an elevated building supporting a water tank.

Water Tower may also refer to:

Buildings
 Water Tower, Chester, a 14th-century tower in Chester, Cheshire, England
 Water Tower, Svetlogorsk, a historic water tower in Svetlogorsk, Kaliningrad Oblast, Russia
 Water Tower (Zaragoza), a tower built for Expo 2008 in Zaragoza, Spain
 Chicago Water Tower, a historic water tower in Chicago, Illinois, U.S.
 Water Tower Place, a skyscraper in Chicago named after the water tower
 Water Tower (Rock Island, Wisconsin), U.S., a historic building in a state park
 Water Tower, Cardiff Central Station, Wales, a Grade II listed building

Other uses
 "Water Tower" (That '70s Show episode)
 Water Tower, Cardiff Bay, in Roald Dahl Plass, Cardiff, Wales
 Watertower (Fruin), a 2017 sculpture in Milwaukee, Wisconsin
 The Water Tower (newspaper), published at the University of Vermont
 Watertower (album), a 1988 album by Michael Hurley
 "Water Tower" (song), a 2013 song by Charlotte Church
 "The Water Tower" (short story), a 1990 short story by Victor Pelevin
 WaterTower Music, an American record label
 Water Tower (band), an American bluegrass band

See also
 
 water crane